Chyasmitar is a town and Village Development Committee  in Khotang District in the Sagarmatha Zone of eastern Nepal. At the time of the 1991 Nepal census it had a population of 2,167 persons living in 412 individual households. The Tilung language is spoken in Chyasmitar.

References

External links
UN map of the municipalities of Khotang District

Populated places in Khotang District